The Afghanistan cricket team played the West Indies cricket team in India in November and December 2019 to play one Test, three One Day Internationals (ODIs) and three Twenty20 International (T20I) matches. It was the first Test match that Afghanistan played against the West Indies. The two teams had played each other ten times before, with the majority of matches in the Caribbean, with this being Afghanistan's fourth Test match. All the matches were played at the Ekana International Cricket Stadium in Lucknow.

Following the 2019 Cricket World Cup, where Afghanistan lost all of their matches, Rashid Khan was named as the new captain of the Afghanistan cricket team across all three formats. In September 2019, Kieron Pollard was named as the captain of the West Indies' team for the ODIs and T20Is, taking over the roles from Jason Holder. Holder was retained as the Test captain of the team. Nitin Menon was one of the on-field umpires for the Test match, becoming the 62nd Indian to umpire at this level.

The West Indies won the first two ODIs to take an unassailable lead in the series, and secured their first ODI series win since beating Bangladesh 3–0 in August 2014. The West Indies won the final ODI by five wickets, winning the series 3–0, which was also their first whitewash since the Bangladesh series. Afghanistan won the T20I series 2–1. It was the second time that Afghanistan had won a T20I series against a team in the top ten of the ICC T20I Championship rankings, after whitewashing Bangladesh 3–0 in June 2018. The West Indies won the one-off Test match by nine wickets, with the game finishing early on the third day.

Squads

West Indies cricketer Nicholas Pooran was found guilty of ball tampering during the third ODI match. Pooran admitted the charge, and was banned for four T20I matches. Shai Hope was added to the West Indies' T20I squad for the final match, as cover for Denesh Ramdin who was injured.

Tour matches

50 over match: Afghanistan XI vs West Indies

Four-day match: Afghanistan XI vs West Indies

ODI series

1st ODI

2nd ODI

3rd ODI

T20I series

1st T20I

2nd T20I

3rd T20I

Only Test

Notes

References

External links
 Series home at ESPN Cricinfo

2019 in Afghan cricket
2019 in West Indian cricket
International cricket competitions in 2019–20
Afghan cricket tours of India
West Indian cricket tours of India